Richard Bruno (August 21, 1924 – January 11, 2012) was an American costume designer. He worked on several feature films including Goodfellas, Raging Bull, The King of Comedy , and The Color of Money.

He won the BAFTA Award for Best Costume Design in 1990 for his work on Goodfellas.

Bruno died on January 11, 2012, aged 87.

References

External links

1924 births
2012 deaths
American costume designers
Best Costume Design BAFTA Award winners
Deaths from kidney failure